Chos Malal is the capital city of the Chos Malal Department in Neuquén Province, Argentina.

History 
Chos Malal was founded on 4 August 1887 by Colonel José Olascoaga. It developed as a control point for policing the movement of cattle with a view to the suppression of cattle raiding.

The city was the capital of the Territorio del Neuquén until 1904 when the capital and administrative buildings were moved to Neuquén, capital city of the Confluencia Department, the arrival there of the railway having provided an economic boost which helped the city of Neuquén to grow very rapidly.

Toponymy
The name Chos Malal derives from Mapuche words meaning "yellow corral" – from the distinctively yellow colour of the sedimentary flagstone rock that predominates in the hills surrounding the city.

Geography 
Chos Malal is located between the Neuquén River and Curi Leuvú river in the Cordillera del Viento. It is surrounded by conifer forests, mostly of Araucaria trees.

Climate
Chos Malal has a semi-arid climate (Köppen BSk), with cold winters and hot summers; during the winter there are regular snow storms.

Culture 
The Jose Olascoaga historical museum located in the city has exhibits of many historical pieces of the Conquest of the Desert such as documents, soldier's equipment and Mapuche objects.

References 

Populated places established in 1887
Populated places in Neuquén Province
Cities in Argentina
Argentina
Neuquén Province